Nick Kyrgios defeated Daniil Medvedev in the final, 7–6(8–6), 7–6(7–4) to win the men's singles tennis title at the 2019 Washington Open. Kyrgios saved a match point in the semifinals against Stefanos Tsitsipas.

Alexander Zverev was the two-time reigning champion, but did not defend his title.

Seeds
All seeds receive a bye into the second round.

Draw

Finals

Top half

Section 1

Section 2

Bottom half

Section 3

Section 4

Qualifying

Seeds

Qualifiers

Lucky losers

Qualifying draw

First qualifier

Second qualifier

Third qualifier

Fourth qualifier

Fifth qualifier

Sixth qualifier

References

External links
Main draw
Qualifying draw

2019 ATP Tour